UFC Fight Night: Machida vs. Dollaway (also known as UFC Fight Night 58) was a mixed martial arts event held at the Ginásio José Corrêa in Barueri, Brazil on December 20, 2014.

Background
The event was the second that the UFC has hosted in Barueri, following UFC Fight Night: Maia vs. Shields in October 2013.

The event was headlined by a middleweight bout between C. B. Dollaway and Lyoto Machida.

Rony Jason was expected to face Tom Niinimäki at the event.  However, Jason pulled out of the bout on December 10 and was replaced by promotional newcomer Renato Moicano.

Dan Miller was expected to face Daniel Sarafian at the event.  However, Miller pulled out of the bout on December 11 and was replaced by promotional newcomer Antônio dos Santos Jr.

During the main card broadcast, it was announced that former UFC Light Heavyweight champion Quinton Jackson had signed a new deal to return to the UFC.

Results

Bonus awards
The following fighters were awarded $50,000 bonuses:
Fight of the Night: None awarded
Performance of the Night: Lyoto Machida, Renan Barão, Erick Silva and Vitor Miranda

See also
List of UFC events
2014 in UFC

References

UFC Fight Night
Mixed martial arts in Brazil
2014 in mixed martial arts
Sport in Barueri
2014 in Brazilian sport
December 2014 sports events in South America